Yemane Haileselassie (born 21 February 1998) is an Eritrean male steeplechase runner. He is the national record holder at 8:22.52 minutes and represented his country at the 2016 Rio Olympics.

He made his international debut at the 2015 IAAF World Cross Country Championships and placed 23rd in the junior race and shared in the team junior bronze medals. A senior debut followed at the 2015 African Games and he placed sixth at the 3000 metres steeplechase.

At the start of the 2016 outdoor season he ran an Eritrean national record of 8:22.52 minutes. He was the fastest entrant at the 2016 IAAF World U20 Championships but was unable to break the Kenyan streak, taking the silver medal behind Amos Kirui close to his personal best with 8:22.67 minutes.

He represented Eritrea at the 2016 Summer Olympics and placed eleventh in the final. He competed at the 2020 Summer Olympics and placed fifth.

International competitions

References

Living people
1998 births
Eritrean male long-distance runners
Eritrean male steeplechase runners
Olympic athletes of Eritrea
Athletes (track and field) at the 2016 Summer Olympics
World Athletics Championships athletes for Eritrea
Athletes (track and field) at the 2015 African Games
African Games competitors for Eritrea
Athletes (track and field) at the 2020 Summer Olympics
21st-century Eritrean people